The Dubai World Trade Centre (DWTC), historically called Sheikh Rashid Tower, is a 38-storey and a height 184 m skyscraper in Dubai, United Arab Emirates, which was erected in 1979. It is a purpose-built complex for events and exhibitions. The building is featured on the 100 dirham bank note.

With over 1.3 million square feet of covered exhibition and event space, comprising 21 halls and over 40 meeting rooms across 3 floors, Dubai World Trade Centre hosts over 500 events annually. In 2015, the venue held 396 trade events and welcomed over 2.74 million visitors.

History
Built in 1979, the Sheikh Rashid Tower, as it was known back then, was amongst the earliest skyscrapers to be constructed in Dubai. The 39-story tower was designed by John R Harris and Partners (JRHP). It was inaugurated by Queen Elizabeth II on 26 February 1979. Later, after the death of Sheikh Rashid Bin Saeed Al Maktoum, the building was renamed in his honour.

The tower, no longer stands alone as it did when it was first built. Over the years, the Dubai World Trade Centre has been extended to include Exhibition Halls, Sheikh Rashid Hall and Maktoum Hall as well as the Al Mulaqua Ballroom, Sheikh Saeed Halls, Za’abeel Halls and the Trade Centre Arena. In addition, commercial buildings have been added including the Convention Tower and the One Central development with several mixed-use buildings.

In April 2020, in efforts to counter the COVID-19 pandemic, the DWTC was converted into a field hospital and Randox laboratories with a capacity to treat up to 3,000 COVID-19 patients.

In December 2021, The Dubai World Trade Centre announced that it will become a comprehensive zone and regulator of cryptocurrencies, products, operators and exchanges. A few days later it announced that it had signed a cooperation agreement with cryptocurrency exchange Binance to set up an international virtual asset ecosystem.

Foreign consulates
The Consulate-General of Italy resides on the 17th floor, the Consulate-General of Japan resides on the 28th floor, the Consulate-General of Switzerland resides on the 22nd floor, and the Consulate-General of Turkey resides on the 29th floor.

Hotels
Two of the Accor owned hotels, 'Novotel World Trade Centre Dubai' and 'ibis World Trade Centre Dubai' are located at the premises of DWTC with interconnectivity.

See also
 World Trade Centre Residence
 World Trade Centre (Dubai Metro) station

References

External links
Official website
 Dubai before and after

1979 establishments in the United Arab Emirates
Buildings and structures completed in 1979
World Trade Centers
Skyscraper office buildings in Dubai
Diplomatic missions of Italy
Diplomatic missions of Japan
Diplomatic missions of Switzerland
Diplomatic missions of Turkey
Diplomatic missions in Dubai